The Tehran Times is an English-language daily newspaper. Ayatollah Mohammad Hossein Beheshti, second in line in the political hierarchy following the 1979 Islamic Revolution, stated: "Tehran Times is not a state-owned newspaper, rather it must be the voice of the oppressed people in the world.” Although the newspaper is not state-owned, "it aims to disseminate key tenets of the Islamic Revolution and is therefore generally supportive of the Islamic Republic of Iran's ideology". According to the Iranian-American Middle East scholar, Ray Takeyh, the Tehran Times has "close ties with the [Iranian] Foreign Ministry."

Academics, ambassadors, policymakers and international affairs analysts frequently contribute to the newspaper.

History 
The newspaper was founded in 1979 as a foreign-language voice of the Islamic Revolution. 

In 2002, the Tehran Times established a news agency which later came to be known as the Mehr News Agency (MNA). Now, Tehran Times and the MNA are run by a single management system with MNA staff triple that of Tehran Times. The MNA is now considered one of the most important news organizations in Iran. Mohammad Shojaeian took over as the new managing director of the Tehran Times and the MNA in September 2019.

On April 12, 2020, Shojaeian appointed Ali A. Jenabzadeh as the editor in chief of Tehran Times daily newspaper.

See also
List of newspapers in Iran

References

External links
Official Website

1979 establishments in Iran
English-language newspapers published in Asia
Newspapers published in Tehran
Newspapers established in 1979